Armanto Archimandritis (born 12 August 1986) is a Cypriot cyclist.

Major results

Road

2014
 1st  National Road Race Championships
2016
 National Road Championships
1st  Road race
2nd Time trial
 9th Hets Hatsafon
2017
 3rd National Time Trial Championships
 9th Road race, Games of the Small States of Europe
2018
 3rd National Road Race Championships
2019
 2nd National Road Race Championships

References

1986 births
Living people
Cypriot male cyclists
European Games competitors for Cyprus
Cyclists at the 2019 European Games
20th-century Cypriot people
21st-century Cypriot people